Sarapady is a small village in Karnataka State, India on the banks of the Nethravathi river in the Bantwal taluk, Dakshina Kannada District.

There were plans of building a dam near it which necessitated the evacuation of the villagers from Sarapady, but the plans have been stalled. However a vented dam in Sarapady now helps MRPL pump water from Nethravathi.

Temple
Sarabeshwara temple in Sarapady. And sadashiva temple in kadeshivalaya. .

Church
St. john church in Allipade.

Localities
Odadadka

Mosque
Ajilamogaru Mosque.

Periyapade
Sri Dugalaya, Kodamanithaya daivastana in periyapade.

External links
 

 Villages in Dakshina Kannada district